27 Pembridge Gardens is a heritage building located in the Notting Hill Gate area of London. The building is a Grade II listed building, number 422765, dating from mid-19th century.

It is a 3-storey building, stuccoed, with rustication. It has a small Doric-style central entrance porch, pediments on the first floor windows, and is "part of unified scheme with Nos 2–34, 1–25, 29 and Pembridge Square."

Since 1924 it has been occupied by the Order of Women Freemasons and is used as the order's headquarters.

References

External links
 Images of England

Grade II listed buildings in the Royal Borough of Kensington and Chelsea
Grade II listed office buildings
Masonic buildings in the United Kingdom
Office buildings in London